SandpiperCI (formerly CI Traders) is an international retail and foodservice operator with over 80 stores across five territories. They are a franchise partner with 10 of the world’s best brands as well as managing six locally grown brands to bring great shopping experiences to thousands of customers across the Channel Islands, Gibraltar, and Isle of Man.

On 27 June 2007 the group was sold to a private equity consortium comprising Duke Street Capital and Europa Capital for £260 million. In 2016 the company ownership reverted to a Channel Islands consortium.

Current operations
SandpiperCI consists of wholly owned operations trading as Checkers Xpress, Wine Warehouse, Le Cocq's Stores, Richards Newsagents & Post Office, The Gibraltar Bakery, and Liberty Wharf. Plus a number of other franchises: Marks & Spencer, Morrisons Daily, Iceland, Costa Coffee, Hotel Chocolat, Crew Clothing, Card Factory, iQ (an Apple reseller), Matalan, and Burger King.

Burger King
In January 2016, SandpiperCI announced a deal with Burger King to operate restaurants in the Channel Islands. The 60-seater restaurant at 41 The Parade, St Helier, incorporates Burger King’s new interiors concept which replicates an outdoor barbecue atmosphere. This restaurant is known for serving high-quality, great-tasting, and affordable food.

Card Factory
In 2019, SandpiperCI opened up three Card Factory stores in Jersey, Guernsey, and the Isle of Man. Card Factory offers quality and choice for all life’s moments. You can find an exciting selection of gifts, wrapping paper, balloons, gift bags, and much, much more.

Checkers and Checkers Xpress
Checkers was a small supermarket chain in the Channel Islands, which was operated by SandpiperCI. It was sold in 2011 to Waitrose. In 2017, SandpiperCI acquired the Costcutter stores which were then converted into Food Halls and Checkers Xpress. Checkers Xpress is SandpiperCI’s wholly-owned convenience and forecourt retailer with seven stores at key locations in both Jersey and Guernsey. From fresh meat and produce to everyday essentials – Checkers Xpress appeals to island residents and tourists alike.

Costa Coffee
SandpiperCI opened their first Costa Coffee in Jersey in 2008. They now operate a total of nine stores across Jersey, Guernsey, and Gibraltar, offering freshly brewed coffee, tasty meals, delicious snacks, and sweet treats.

Crew Clothing
In January 2013, SandpiperCI acquired and opened Crew Clothing in St Helier, Jersey, followed by a 2nd store in Guernsey. Crew Clothing is a British clothing retailer that specialises in offering a stylish range of clothing, shoes, and accessories.

Hotel Chocolat
SandpiperCI acquired and opened Hotel Chocolat in 2011. They now operate 3 stores across Jersey, Guernsey, and Gibraltar. Hotel Chocolat is a British chocolatier and cacao grower specialising in luxurious chocolate gifts & presents for every occasion.

Iceland
SandpiperCI opened their first Iceland store in Georgetown, Jersey in 2008. Due to its outstanding success, we opened a further nine Iceland stores; five in Jersey along with four in Guernsey. Iceland is an expert in frozen food, delivering great ideas for busy, value-conscious families. In the Channel Islands, all Iceland stores stock 1000s of Iceland's branded products. They also stock an extensive range of chilled, branded, and everyday essential products including fresh fruit and vegetables.

iQ Apple Premium Reseller
SandpiperCI acquired the iQ franchise in Jersey and Guernsey in 2017 and opened a further store in the Isle of Man in 2020. As the only Apple Premium Reseller in the Channel Islands and Isle of Man, iQ offers all the latest Apple products you know and love, along with a number of other great brands like Bose, Sonos, Marshall, Speck, and Belkin, to name but a few.

Le Cocq's Stores
Le Cocq's Stores were founded in Alderney in 1860 and were bought by SandpiperCI in September 2020. The chain is currently made up of two shops based in Le Huret, and Braye Harbour (known as Freezer Centre at The Cuttings).

Liberty Wharf
In 2018, SandpiperCI purchased Liberty Wharf shopping centre in St Helier, Jersey. Open seven days a week, Liberty Wharf is a shopping and eating destination, housed in a beautifully restored Victorian building at the gateway of St Helier and only a five-minute walk from the harbour and bus station.

Marks & Spencer
Marks & Spencer in Jersey has been operating under the franchise with SandpiperCI for over 50 years, with seven stores across the island covering food, clothing and home. As well as the flagship King Street store, they operate five Simply Food stores across the island, as well as a clothing, home and food in St Brelade.

Matalan
SandpiperCI acquired the Matalan franchise and opened its first stores in Liberty Wharf, Jersey, and St Martins, Guernsey, in March 2021. Matalan is a great value family retail offering the latest seasonal looks for women, men and kids, plus a huge range of homewares to enjoy.

Morrisons Daily
In February 2018, the British supermarket chain, Morrisons, announced a new wholesale supply initiative with SandpiperCI, which included a number of their 43 stores being re-branded as "Morrisons Daily" and selling Morrisons' own-brand products. By 2022, SandpiperCI had converted 19 of their stores in the Channel Islands to the Morrisons Daily format, including the former Benest's of Millbrook store at Lisbon House, which was run by the Benest family for more than 100 years.

Richards Newsagents & Post Office
SandpiperCI acquired Richards Newsagents & Post Office in Alderney in 2022. The popular store currently trades from the heart of Alderney’s shopping high street, providing the community with newspapers, stationery, greeting cards, confectionery, souvenirs and sundries as well as providing Post Office services.

The Gibraltar Bakery
The Gibraltar Bakery is a bakery and coffee shop located at Grand Casemates Square, Gibraltar serving pastries, croissants, and cakes. The Gibraltar Bakery was formally run as a franchise of The Cornish Bakery, a British chain founded in 1994 as Pasty Presto, which has more than 30 outlets in the UK.

The Wine  Warehouse
Since 1995, SandpiperCI operates the largest off-license chain in the islands under the name of Wine Warehouse with 14 stores in Jersey and five located in Guernsey. The majority of Wine Warehouses can be found as sections within their other branded grocery stores, but separate stand-alone Wine Warehouses can be found at Five Oaks in St Saviour and next to Morrisons Daily Benest store at Lisbon House in Millbrook.

Others
MMD Shipping Services, a Portsmouth-based business that specialises in stevedoring, warehousing and distribution services, publishing, brewing, baking, and Channel Rentals (company and residential technology hire) figure amongst the group's other activities. These divisions are now run separately.

The property division (formally COMPROP) is responsible for the acquisition and development of commercial and residential property which is then sold or retained for letting.

Former operations

Large supermarkets 
In October 2010 it was announced that contracts had been exchanged for the sale of the three major Checkers supermarkets, at Redhouse's and Rue des Pres in Jersey and Admiral Park in Guernsey, to Waitrose. The deal was subject, amongst other things, to the approval of the Jersey Competition Regulatory Authority. Financial details of the transaction were not disclosed.

Safeway

Between 2005 and 2011, CI Traders/ Sandpiper CI operated the Safeway stores in Guernsey and Jersey. When Safeway was bought by Morrisons, the decision was made to sell the Safeway Channel Islands stores, where the stores joined SandpiperCI until they were purchased by Waitrose and converted.

CI Hospitality
CI Hospitality operates in excess of 80 pubs across the islands. The hospitality division is now run separately as Liberation Group.

Cimandis 
A foodservice wholesale and distribution business, Cimandis, was sold to Bidvest 3663 in 2015. , the business continues to be branded Cimandis Foodservice.

Gourmet Burger Kitchen
In 2013, SandpiperCI operated two Gourmet Burger Kitchen restaurants in Guernsey and Jersey.

L'Abeille 
L'Abeille, a French soft drinks manufacturer based in Nantes, was bought by a Jersey brewer in 1989 and merged to form Channel Islands Traders in 2002. The business was sold in 2009.

Pet and Home Discount Centre
In 2014, Sandpiper started its Pet and Home Discount Centre branded 'shop-in-shops'. The concept was to discount products at unbeatable prices. Three stores opened in Jersey, and one opened in Guernsey. All stores quietly closed the same year. The 'shop-in-shop' areas that Pet and Home Discount Centre took up now house Checkers Xpress, Iceland, and Wine Warehouse stores.

References

External links
 Sandpiper CI

Companies of the Channel Islands
2007 establishments in Jersey